Marshside is a hamlet in the county of Kent, England. It is in the parish of Chislet alongside the Chislet Marshes southeast of Herne Bay.

Governance
An electoral ward in the same name exists with the most populous parish being Sturry. The population of this ward at the 2011 Census was 3.302.

References

City of Canterbury
Hamlets in Kent